The Woman He Loved is a 1922 American silent drama film directed by Edward Sloman and starring William V. Mong, Marcia Manon and Mary Wynn.

Cast
 William V. Mong as Nathan Levinsky
 Marcia Manon as 	Esther Levinsky
 A. Edward Sutherland as Jimmy Danvers 
 Mary Wynn as 	Helen Comstock
 Charles K. French as John Comstock 
 Fred Malatesta as Max Levy
 Harvey Clark as 	John Danvers
 Bruce Guerin as 	David Levinsky, as a child
 Lucille Ward as Rosie Romansky

References

Bibliography
 Bell, Geoffrey. The Golden Gate and the Silver Screen. Associated University Presse, 1984 .
 Connelly, Robert B. The Silents: Silent Feature Films, 1910-36, Volume 40, Issue 2. December Press, 1998.
 Munden, Kenneth White. The American Film Institute Catalog of Motion Pictures Produced in the United States, Part 1. University of California Press, 1997.

External links
 

1922 films
1922 drama films
1920s English-language films
American silent feature films
Silent American drama films
American black-and-white films
Films directed by Edward Sloman
1920s American films
English-language drama films